Ang Larawan, internationally released as , is a 2017 Philippine musical film directed by Loy Arcenas.

Based on the 1997 stage play, Larawan which in turn was based on the 1950 literary play A Portrait of the Artist as Filipino by National Artist Nick Joaquin, the film takes place in 1941 just before World War II in a mansion in Manila.

Ang Larawan had its premiere in Japan on October 30, 2017, as part of the 30th Tokyo International Film Festival. It was commercially released in the Philippines on December 25, 2017, as an entry to the 43rd Metro Manila Film Festival, where it won five of its twelve categories, including Best Picture, Best Musical Score, Best Production Design, and the Gatpuno Antonio J. Villegas Cultural Award and Best Actress given to Joana Ampil. Critical response for the film was mostly positive.

Cast
The cast of Ang Larawan includes:

Joanna Ampil as Candida Marasigan
Rachel Alejandro as Paula Marasigan
Paulo Avelino as Tony Javier
Sandino Martin as Bitoy Camacho
Cris Villonco as Susan
Aicelle Santos as Violet
Nonie Buencamino as Manolo
Menchu Lauchengco-Yulo as Pepang
Robert Arevalo as Don Perico
Celeste Legaspi as Doña Loleng
Zsa Zsa Padilla as Elsa Montes
Cara Manglapus as Patsy
Rayver Cruz as Charlie Dacanay
Ogie Alcasid as Pulis Tinio
Jojit Lorenzo as Pulis Bernal
Dulce as Doña Upeng
Nanette Inventor as Doña Irene
Jaime Fabregas as Don Aristeo
Bernardo Bernardo as Don Alvaro
Noel Trinidad as Don Miguel
Leo Rialp as Don Lorenzo Marasigan

Ricky Davao, Mikee Cojuangco, Martin del Rosario, as well as Ryan Cayabyab and his wife and son all made cameo appearances in the film.

Production

Development

Background

The film is based on the 1997 stage play Larawan, which had its 1998 restaging written by Nick Joaquin, a recognized National Artist for Literature<ref name="adapted1997">{{cite news|last1=Banal-Formoso|first1=Chelo|title='Larawan' inspires us to remember, to sing|url=http://newsinfo.inquirer.net/776646/larawan-inspires-us-to-remember-to-sing|access-date=November 20, 2017|work=Philippine Daily Inquirer|quote=National Artist Nick Joaquin’s “Portrait of the Artist as Filipino” is resurrected yet again, this time as a film adaptation of the 1997 stage musical [1997 stage musical: Larawan Film adaptation: 2017 film Ang Larawan].|date=March 29, 2016}}</ref> which in turn was also an adaption of an earlier play A Portrait of the Artist as Filipino, which was also by Joaquin. The film is the third full-length feature film to be directed by Loy Arcenas, a former Broadway production designer.

The film is produced by Culturtain Musicat Productions which is owned by talent manager Girlie Rodis and singer-actress Celeste Legaspi who were also producers of the film.

Rodis aims to present the film as an "alternative" to romance comedy and horror films prevailing in Philippine mainstream cinema but clarified she does not want to "compete" with other local film production companies. She recalled a man in SM Cinema telling her there was a lack of local films suitable for school educational viewings which led her to come up with an "alternative" film.

Financing
The production budget has been described as expensive, with producer Rodis partly responsible for the financing. The National Commission for Culture and the Arts (NCCA), the Quezon City Film Fund, Resorts World Manila, the Film Development Council of the Philippines, as well as individual sponsors were among the financiers of the film. Ang Larawan also received endorsements from the Commission on Higher Education and the NCCA.

Filming

Principal photography on Ang Larawan began in June 2015, with Boy Yñiguez as cinematographer. It officially began in Intramuros, Manila for the La Naval procession scene, where 600 costumed extras were involved. Filming with the cast occurred in Taal, Batangas and lasted 11 days, particularly in the Villavicencio ancestral home, which served as the ancestral home of the protagonists' family in Intramuros. Gino Gonzales supervised the production design. While the music and song performances were mostly prerecorded, the dialogues were recorded live.

Music
The libretto used in the film was by deceased National Artist for Theater and Literature Rolando Tinio while the ABS-CBN Philharmonic Orchestra will render composer Ryan Cayabyab's music which was used for the film. Cayabyab is the musical director. Nick Joaquin has described Tinio's libretto style as "Tinio’s Manila Tagalog".

One of Arcenas' key direction of the film is to treat the film's songs as dialogue remarking that the songs are "not set pieces" and "they have to blend with the text". Many rehearsals were done were the acting members of the cast had to practice delivering both speaking lines and singing songs. The production team decided to make the Ang Larawan as a musical film instead of a traditional play so it would be more acceptable to a younger audience and a musical setup would allow for "funny and light moments". All song performances in the film were prerecorded except for a single solo performance by Joanna Ampil as her character, Candida in "Act One".

Release

Theatrical runAng Larawan was first released in Japan in 2017 as part of the 30th Tokyo International Film Festival (TIFF) under the title, . The film's TIFF release was in Filipino and Part Color and had a duration of 120 minutes. The film was screened from October 30–31, 2017 at the TOHO Cinemas in Roponggi Hills. It was one of the ten nominated films which vied for the Asian Future Film award.

The film had its Philippine theatrical release as one of the eight entries of the 2017 Metro Manila Film Festival which began on December 25, 2017. Ang Larawan was announced as an entry to the film festival in November 2017 with three other films. According to the MMFF organizers, after the producers learned about the first day sales, they decided to come up with an agreement with select mall owners to pull out Ang Larawan from select cinemas the producers deemed that have a limited market. They agreed to bring back the film in those selected cinemas on January 1, 2018.

Reception
Box office
During the official run of the 2017 Metro Manila Film Festival, Ang Larawan garnered a total of  box office gross, and was ranked seventh among eight film entries in terms of sale.

Critical responseAng Larawan drew very positive reactions from critics. Richard Kuipers, a film critic writing for Variety'' described the film as "beautifully decorated and top-notch in every technical detail" and added that it was "clearly made with the utmost love and care". Kuipers also praised the performance of  Joanna Ampil and Rachel Alejandro as sisters Candida and Paula. The critic also remarked that Roland Tinio's lyrics and Ryan Cayabyab's musical direction created a "highly effective atmosphere of doom, gloom and family turmoil before offering a ray of light".

Tristan Zinampan of Screen Anarchy commented that "The meticulousness of 'Ang Larawan'’s crafting is in itself is an act of love. Performances, production design, and, of course, the music carries this affection as all the above mentioned bring their A-game on screen. They go above and beyond the required, and you can’t help but admire the grandeur exhibited." Oggs Cruz of Rappler said that "the film is a gorgeous pageant of taste and manner. What it lacks in subtlety in its garish sentimentality for a foregone age, it makes up for generosity and vivid earnestness." Fred Hawson, whose review was republished in ABS-CBN News, praised its visuals and music, stating that "the technical aspects of this film -- lush cinematography (with those tight closeups) by Boy Yniguez, meticulous period production design by Gino Gonzales, and of course, the rousing musical score by Ryan Cayabyab -- definitely stand out and deserve award recognition." Broadway World's Oliver Oliveros praised Ampil and Alejandro's performances, saying that they "make a pair of complementing heroines whose life choices--whether they're right or wrong--and their instinctive spoken lines and impassioned singing keep you in the palm of their hands in the film's entirety--they both keep the movie moving and authentic." Members of the Cinema Evaluation Board unanimously gave the film an "A" rating.

Accolades

The Gabi ng Parangal of the 2017 Metro Manila Film Festival was held on December 27, 2017, at the Kia Theatre in Quezon City. 'Ang Larawan' earned a total of five awards, including Best Picture.

References

External links

Films set in 1941
Films set in Manila
Philippine musical films
Films shot in Manila
Films shot in Batangas
2010s musical films